Patricia Molseed is a vision impaired Australian Paralympic athlete.  She won a gold medal at the 1988 Seoul Games in the Women's Shot Put B1 event. Her first throw of 8.82 m was a Paralympic record but also resulted in a torn back muscle with prevented her further good throws.  She was 43 during the Games and a school teacher in Perth, Western Australia.

In 2013, she was a music teacher at Bluff Point Primary School, Geraldton, Western Australia and had a guide dog.

References

Paralympic athletes of Australia
Athletes (track and field) at the 1988 Summer Paralympics
Paralympic gold medalists for Australia
Australian blind people
Visually impaired shot putters
Living people
Medalists at the 1988 Summer Paralympics
Sportswomen from Western Australia
Athletes from Perth, Western Australia
Australian female shot putters
Year of birth missing (living people)
Paralympic medalists in athletics (track and field)
Paralympic shot putters
20th-century Australian women